Mass function may refer to:

Binary mass function, a function that gives the minimum mass of a star or planet in a spectroscopic binary system
Halo mass function, a function that describes the mass distribution of dark matter halos
Initial mass function, a function that describes the distribution of star masses when they initially form, before evolution
Probability mass function, a function that gives the probability that a discrete random variable is exactly equal to some value